Virgin Vodka was an alcoholic beverage produced by Virgin Drinks, a no longer extant subsidiary of the Virgin Group owned by Richard Branson. It was launched in 1994 and was withdrawn from the market some years later, as Virgin Drinks disbanded.

History 
Virgin Trading Company and William Grant & Sons announced a commercial agreement to market Virgin Vodka in the UK in 1994.

External links 
Virgin Drinks

British vodkas
Virgin Group